The following is the list of squads for each of the 16 teams competing in the FIBA EuroBasket 2009, held in Poland between 7 and 20 September 2009. Each team selected a squad of 12 players for the tournament.

Group A

Greece

Coach:  Jonas Kazlauskas

Croatia

Coach: Jasmin Repeša

Macedonia

Coach:  Jovica Arsić

Israel

Coach: Zvi Sherf

Group B

Russia

Coach:  David Blatt

Germany

Coach: Dirk Bauermann

Latvia

Coach:   Kęstutis Kemzūra

France

Coach:  Vincent Collet

Group C

Spain

Coach:  Sergio Scariolo

Slovenia

Coach: Jure Zdovc

Serbia

Coach: Dušan Ivković

Great Britain

Coach:  Chris Finch

Group D

Lithuania

Coach: Ramūnas Butautas

Turkey

Coach:  Bogdan Tanjević

Poland

Coach:  Muli Katzurin

Bulgaria

Coach:  Pini Gershon

squads
2009